Samatha (Pāli;), "calm," "serenity,"  "tranquillity of awareness," and vipassanā (Pāli; Sinhala  විදර්ශනා (Vidarshana); Sanskrit vipaśyanā), literally "special, super (vi-), seeing (-passanā)", are two qualities of the mind developed in tandem in Buddhist practice. In the Pali Canon and the Āgama they are not specific practices, but elements of "a single path," and "fulfilled" with the development (bhāvanā) of sati ("mindfulness") and jhana/dhyana ("meditation") and other path-factors. While jhana/dhyana has a central role in the Buddhist path, vipassanā is hardly mentioned separately, but mostly described along with samatha.

The Abhidhamma Pitaka and the commentaries describe samatha and vipassanā as two separate techniques, taking samatha to mean concentration-meditation, and vipassana as a practice to gain insight. In the Theravada-tradition, vipassanā is defined as a practice that seeks "insight into the true nature of reality", defined as anicca "impermanence", dukkha "suffering, unsatisfactoriness", anattā "non-self", the three marks of existence. In the Mahayana-traditions vipassanā is defined as insight into śūnyatā "emptiness" and Buddha-nature.

In modern Theravada, the relation between samatha and vipassanā is a matter of dispute. Meditation-practice was reinvented in the Theravada tradition in the 18th-20th century, based on contemporary readings of the Satipaṭṭhāna sutta, the Visuddhimagga, and other texts, centering on vipassana and 'dry insight' and downplaying samatha. Vipassana became of central importance in the 20th century Vipassanā movement favoring vipassanā over samatha. Some critics point out that both are necessary elements of the Buddhist training, while other critics argue that dhyana is not a single-pointed concentration exercise.

Etymology

Samatha
Sanskrit: "tranquility"; "tranquility of the mind"; "tranquillity of awareness"; "serenity"; "calm"; "meditative calm"; "quietude of the heart."

The Tibetan term for samatha is shyiné. The semantic field of Sanskrit shama and Tibetan shi is "pacification", "the slowing or cooling down", "rest." The semantic field of Tibetan né is "to abide or remain" and this is cognate or equivalent with the final syllable of the Sanskrit, thā. According to Jamgon Kongtrul, the terms refer to "peace" and "pacification" of the mind and the thoughts.

Vipassana
Vipassanā is a Pali word derived from the prefix "vi-" and the verbal root "-passanā": 
 prefix vi-: "special," "super"; "in a special way," "into, through"; "clear."
 verbal root -passanā: "seeing"; "seeing," "perceiving"; "free from preconception."

The literal meaning is "super-seeing," but is often translated as "insight" or "clear-seeing." Henepola Gunaratana defines vipassanā as "[l]ooking into something with clarity and precision, seeing each component as distinct and separate, and piercing all the way through so as to perceive the most fundamental reality of that thing." According to Mitchell Ginsberg, vipassana is "[i]nsight into how things are, not how we thought them to be."

A synonym for vipassanā is paccakkha "perceptible to the senses" (Pāli;), literally "before the eyes", which refers to direct experiential perception. Thus, the type of seeing denoted by vipassanā is that of direct perception, as opposed to knowledge derived from reasoning or argument.

In Tibetan, vipaśyanā is lhaktong. Lhak means "higher", "superior", "greater"; tong is "view, to see". So together, lhaktong may be rendered into English as "superior seeing", "great vision" or "supreme wisdom". This may be interpreted as a "superior manner of seeing", and also as "seeing that which is the essential nature". Its nature is a lucidity—a clarity of mind.

Origins and development

Early Buddhism

According to Thanissaro Bhikkhu, "samatha, jhana, and vipassana were all part of a single path." According to Keren Arbel, samatha and vipassana are not specific practices, but qualities of the mind which come to fulfillment with the development of the factors of the Noble Eightfold Path, including sati ("mindfulness") and jhana/dhyana (meditation"). In the sutta pitaka the term "vipassanā" is hardly mentioned, while they frequently mention jhana as the meditative practice to be undertaken. As Thanissaro Bhikkhu writes, 

According to Vetter and Bronkhorst, dhyāna constituted the original "liberating practice" of the Buddha. Vetter further argues that the Noble Eightfold Path constitutes a body of practices which prepare one, and lead up to, the practice of dhyana. Vetter and Bronkhorst further note that dhyana is not limited to single-pointed concentration, which seems to be described in the first jhana, but develops into equanimity and mindfulness, "born from samadhi." Wynne notes that one is then no longer absorbed in concentration, but is mindfully aware of objects while being indifferent to it, "directing states of meditative absorption towards the mindful awareness of objects."

A number of suttas mention samatha and vipassana as mental qualities that are to be developed in tandem. In SN 43.2, the Buddha states: "And what, bhikkhus, is the path leading to the unconditioned? Serenity and insight...." In SN 35.245, the Kimsuka Tree Sutta, the Buddha provides an elaborate metaphor in which serenity and insight are "the swift pair of messengers" who deliver the message of nibbana (Pāli; Skt.: Nirvana) via the noble eightfold path. AN 2.30, Vijja-bhagiya Sutta ("A Share in Clear Knowing"):

In AN 4.170, the Four Ways to Arahantship Sutta, Ven. Ānanda reports that people attain arahantship in one of four ways:

Disjunction of samatha and vipassana
Buddhaghosa, in his influential Theravada scholastic treatise Visuddhimagga, states that jhana is induced by samatha, and then jhana is reflected upon with mindfulness, becoming the object of vipassana, realizing that jhana is marked by the three characteristics. One who uses this method is referred to as a "tranquility worker" (Pali: samatha yānika). However modern Buddhist teachers such as Henepola Gunaratana state that there is virtually no evidence of this method in the Pali suttas. A few suttas describe a method of "bare insight", or "dry insight" where only vipassana is practiced, examining ordinary physical and mental phenomena to discern the three marks. Gombrich and Brooks argue that the distinction as two separate paths originates in the earliest interpretations of the Sutta Pitaka, not in the suttas themselves.

According to Richard Gombrich, a development took place in early Buddhism resulting in a change in doctrine, which considered prajna to be an alternative means to awakening, alongside the practice of dhyana. The suttas contain traces of ancient debates between Mahayana and Theravada schools in the interpretation of the teachings and the development of insight. Out of these debates developed the idea that bare insight suffices to reach liberation, by discerning the three marks (qualities) of (human) existence (tilakkhana), namely dukkha (suffering), anatta (non-self) and anicca (impermanence). Thanissaro Bikkhu also argues that samatha and vipassana have a "unified role," whereas "[t]he Abhidhamma and the Commentaries, by contrast, state that samatha and vipassana are two distinct meditation paths."

Gunaratana notes that "[t]he classical source for the distinction between the two vehicles of serenity and insight is the Visuddhimagga." Referencing MN 151, vv. 13-19, and AN IV, 125-27, Ajahn Brahm (who, like Bhikkhu Thanissaro, is of the Thai Forest Tradition) writes that

Theravāda and the vipassana movement
By the tenth century meditation was no longer practiced in the Theravada tradition, due to the belief that Buddhism had degenerated, and that liberation was no longer attainable until the coming of the future Buddha, Maitreya. It was re-invented in Myanmar (Burma) in the 18th century by Medawi (1728–1816), leading to the rise of the Vipassana movement in the 20th century, re-inventing vipassana meditation and developing simplified meditation techniques, based on the Satipatthana sutta, the Ānāpānasati Sutta, the Visuddhimagga, and other texts, emphasizing satipatthana and bare insight. In this approach, samatha is regarded as a preparation for vipassanā, pacifying the mind and strengthening concentration, in order for insight into impermanence to arise, which leads to liberation. Ultimately, these techniques aim at stream entry, with the idea that this first stage of the path to awakening safeguards future development of the person towards full awakening, despite the degenerated age we live in.

Samatha
According to the Theravada tradition, samatha refers to techniques that assist in calming the mind. Samatha is thought to be developed by samadhi, interpreted by the Theravada commentatorial tradition as concentration-meditation, the ability to rest the attention on a single object of perception. One of the principal techniques for this purpose is mindfulness of breathing (Pali: ānāpānasati). Samatha is commonly practiced as a prelude to and in conjunction with wisdom practices.

Objects of samatha-meditation
Some meditation practices such as contemplation of a kasina object favor the development of samatha, others such as contemplation of the aggregates are conducive to the development of vipassana, while others such as mindfulness of breathing are classically used for developing both mental qualities.

The Visuddhimagga (5th century CE) mentions forty objects of meditation. Mindfulness (sati) of breathing (ānāpāna: ānāpānasati; S. ānāpānasmṛti) is the most common samatha practice. Samatha can include other samādhi practices as well.

Signs and stages of joy in samatha-meditation
Theravada Buddhism describes the development of samatha in terms of three successive mental images or 'signs' (nimitta) and five stages of joy (Pīti). According to the Theravada-tradition, pīti, a feeling of joy, gladness or rapture, arises from the abandonment of the five hindrances in favor of concentration on a single object. These stages are outlined by the Theravada exegete Buddhaghosa in his Visuddhimagga (also in Atthasālinī) and the earlier Upatissa (author of the Vimuttimagga). Following the establishment of access concentration (upacāra-samādhi), one can enter the four jhanas, powerful states of joyful absorption in which the entire body is pervaded with Pīti.

Variations in samatha
In the Theravada-tradition various understandings of samatha exist;
 In Sri Lanka samatha includes all the meditations directed at static objects.
 In Burma, samatha comprises all concentration practices, aimed at calming the mind.
 The Thai Forest tradition deriving from Ajahn Mun and popularized by Ajahn Chah stresses the inseparability of samatha and vipassana, and the essential necessity of both practices.

Vipassana
In modern Theravada, liberation is thought to be attained by insight into the transitory nature of phenomena. This is accomplished by establishing sati (mindfulness) and samatha through the practice of anapanasati (mindfulness of breathing), using mindfulness for observing the impermanence in the bodily and mental changes, to gain insight (vipassanā (P: vipassanā; S: vipaśyana), sampajañña) c.q. wisdom (P: paññā, S: prajñā) into the true nature of phenomena.

Vipassanā movement

The term vipassana is often conflated with the Vipassana movement, a movement which popularised the new vipassana teachings and practice. It started in the 1950s in Burma, but has gained wide renown mainly through American Buddhist teachers such as Joseph Goldstein, Tara Brach, Gil Fronsdal, Sharon Salzberg, and Jack Kornfield. The movement has had a wide appeal due to being open and inclusive to different Buddhist and non-buddhist wisdom, poetry as well as science. It has together with the modern American Zen tradition served as one of the main inspirations for the 'mindfulness movement' as developed by Jon Kabat-Zinn and others. The Vipassanā Movement, also known as the Insight Meditation Movement, is rooted in Theravāda Buddhism and the revival of meditation techniques, especially the "New Burmese Method" and the Thai Forest Tradition, as well as the modern influences on the traditions of Sri Lanka, Burma, Laos and Thailand.

In the Vipassanā Movement, the emphasis is on the Satipatthana Sutta and the use of mindfulness to gain insight into the impermanence of the self. It argues that the development of strong samatha can be disadvantageous, a stance for which the Vipassana Movement has been criticised, especially in Sri Lanka. The "New Burmese Method" was developed by U Nārada (1868–1955), and popularised by Mahasi Sayadaw (1904–1982) and Nyanaponika Thera (1901–1994). Other influential Burmese proponents include Ledi Sayadaw and Mogok Sayadaw (who was less known to the West due to lack of International Mogok Centres) as well as Mother Sayamagyi and S. N. Goenka, who were both students of Sayagyi U Ba Khin. Influential Thai teachers are Ajahn Chah and Buddhadasa. A well-known Asian female teacher is Dipa Ma.

Stages of practice
Practice begins with the preparatory stage, the practice of sila, morality, giving up worldly thoughts and desires.<ref>Mahāsi Sayādaw, Manual of Insight, Chapter 5</ref> Jeff Wilson notes that morality is a quintessential element of Buddhist practice, and is also emphasized by the first generation of post-war western teachers. Yet, in the contemporary mindfulness movement, morality as an element of practice has been mostly discarded, 'mystifying' the origins of mindfulness.

The practitioner then engages in anapanasati, mindfulness of breathing, which is described in the Satipatthana Sutta as going into the forest and sitting beneath a tree and then to simply watch the breath. If the breath is long, to notice that the breath is long, if the breath is short, to notice that the breath is short.Satipatthana Sutta In the "New Burmese Method", the practitioner pays attention to any arising mental or physical phenomenon, engaging in vitarka, noting or naming physical and mental phenomena ("breathing, breathing"), without engaging the phenomenon with further conceptual thinking.Bhante Bodhidhamma, Vipassana as taught by The Mahasi Sayadaw of Burma  By noticing the arising of physical and mental phenomena, the meditator becomes aware how sense impressions arise from the contact between the senses and physical and mental phenomena, as described in the five skandhas and paṭiccasamuppāda. According to Sayadaw U Pandita, awareness and observation of these sensations is de-coupled from any kind of physical response, which is intended to recondition one's impulsive responses to stimuli, becoming less likely to physically or emotionally overreact to the happenings of the world.

The practitioner also becomes aware of the perpetual changes involved in breathing, and the arising and passing away of mindfulness. This noticing is accompanied by reflections on causation and other Buddhist teachings, leading to insight into dukkha, anatta, and anicca. When the three characteristics have been comprehended, reflection subdues, and the process of noticing accelerates, noting phenomena in general, without necessarily naming them.

According to Thai meditation master Ajahn Lee, the practice of both samatha and vipassana together allows one to achieve various mental powers and knowledges (Pali: abhiññā), including the attainment of Nirvana, whereas the practice of vipassana alone allows for the achievement of Nirvana, but no other mental powers or knowledges.

Vipassanā jhanas
Vipassanā jhanas are stages that describe the development of samatha in vipassanā meditation practice as described in modern Burmese Vipassana meditation. 
Mahasi Sayadaw's student Sayadaw U Pandita described the four vipassanā jhanas as follows:
 The meditator first explores the body/mind connection as one, nonduality; discovering three characteristics. The first jhana consists in seeing these points and in the presence of vitarka and vicara. Phenomena reveal themselves as appearing and ceasing.
 In the second jhana, the practice seems effortless. Vitarka and vicara both disappear.
 In the third jhana, piti, the joy, disappears too: there is only happiness (sukha) and concentration.
 The fourth jhana arises, characterised by purity of mindfulness due to equanimity. The practice leads to direct knowledge. The comfort disappears because the dissolution of all phenomena is clearly visible. The practice will show every phenomenon as unstable, transient, disenchanting. The desire of freedom will take place.

CriticismSamatha meditation and jhana (dhyana) are often considered synonymous by modern Theravada, but the four jhanas involve a heightened awareness, instead of a narrowing of the mind. Vetter notes that samadhi may refer to the four stages of dhyana meditation, but that only the first stage refers to strong concentration, from which arise the other stages, which include mindfulness. According to Richard Gombrich, the sequence of the four rupa-jhanas describes two different cognitive states. Gombrich and Wynne note that, while the second jhana denotes a state of absorption, in the third and fourth jhana one comes out of this absorption, being mindfully aware of objects while being indifferent to it. According to Gombrich, "the later tradition has falsified the jhana by classifying them as the quintessence of the concentrated, calming kind of meditation, ignoring the other – and indeed higher – element. Alexander Wynne further explains that the dhyana-scheme is poorly understood. According to Wynne, words expressing the inculcation of awareness, such as sati, sampajāno, and upekkhā, are mistranslated or understood as particular factors of meditative states, whereas they refer to a particular way of perceiving the sense objects.

Northern tradition
The north Indian Buddhist traditions like the Sarvastivada and the Sautrāntika practiced meditation as outlined in texts like the Abhidharmakośakārikā of Vasubandhu and the Yogācārabhūmi-śāstra. The Abhidharmakośakārikā states that vipaśyanā is practiced once one has reached samadhi "absorption" by cultivating the four foundations of mindfulness (smṛtyupasthānas). This is achieved, according to Vasubandhu,

Asanga's Abhidharma-samuccaya states that the practice of śamatha-vipaśyanā is a part of a Bodhisattva's path at the beginning, in the first "path of preparation" (sambhāramarga).

The Sthavira nikāya, one of the early Buddhist schools from which the Theravada-tradition originates, emphasized sudden insight: "In the Sthaviravada [...] progress in understanding comes all at once, 'insight' (abhisamaya) does not come 'gradually' (successively - anapurva)."

The Mahāsāṃghika, another one of the early Buddhist schools, had the doctrine of ekakṣaṇacitta, "according to which a Buddha knows everything in a single thought-instant". This process however, meant to apply only to the Buddha and Peccaka buddhas. Lay people may have to experience various levels of insights to become fully enlightened.

Mahāyāna
The later Indian Mahayana scholastic tradition, as exemplified by Shantideva's Bodhisattvacaryāvatāra, saw śamatha as a necessary prerequisite to vipaśyanā, and thus, one needed to first begin with calm abiding meditation, and then proceed to insight. In the Pañjikā commentary of Prajñākaramati on the Bodhisattvacaryāvatāra, vipaśyanā is defined simply as "wisdom (prajñā) that has the nature of thorough knowledge of reality as it is.

Samatha
A number of Mahāyāna sūtras address śamatha, usually in conjunction with vipaśyanā. One of the most prominent, the Cloud of Jewels Sutra (Ārya Ratnamegha Sutra, Tib. '''phags-pa dkon-mchog sprin-gyi mdo,  Chinese 寶雲經 T658, 大乘寶雲經 T659) divides all forms of meditation into either śamatha or vipaśyanā, defining śamatha as "single-pointed consciousness" and vipaśyanā as "seeing into the nature of things."

The Sūtra Unlocking the Mysteries (Samdhinirmocana Sūtra), a yogācāra sūtra, is also often used as a source for teachings on śamatha. The Samādhirāja Sūtra is often cited as an important source for śamatha instructions by the Kagyu tradition, particularly via commentary by Gampopa, although scholar Andrew Skilton, who has studied the Samādhirāja Sūtra extensively, reports that the sūtra itself "contains no significant exposition of either meditational practices or states of mind."

Vipassana - prajna and sunyata
The Mahayana tradition emphasizes prajñā, insight into śūnyatā, dharmatā, the two truths doctrine, clarity and emptiness, or bliss and emptiness:

The Mahayana Akṣayamati-nirdeśa refers to vipaśyanā as seeing phenomena as they really are, that is, empty, without self, nonarisen, and without grasping. The Prajnaparamita sutra in 8,000 lines states that the practice of insight is the non-appropriation of any dharmas, including the five aggregates:

Although Theravada and Mahayana are commonly understood as different streams of Buddhism, their practice however, may reflect emphasis on insight as a common denominator: "In practice and understanding Zen is actually very close to the Theravada Forest Tradition even though its language and teachings are heavily influenced by Taoism and Confucianism."

East Asian Mahāyāna

Chinese Buddhism
In Chinese Buddhism, the works of Tiantai master Zhiyi (such as the Mohe Zhiguan, "Great śamatha-vipaśyanā") are some of the most influential texts which discuss vipaśyanā meditation from a Mahayana perspective. In this text, Zhiyi teaches the contemplation of the skandhas, ayatanas, dhātus, the Kleshas, false views and several other elements. Likewise the influential text called the Awakening of Faith in the Mahayana has a section on calm and insight meditation. It states:

Chan/Zen
The Zen tradition advocates the simultaneous practice of śamatha and vipaśyanā, and this is called the practice of silent illumination. The classic Chan text known as the Platform Sutra states:

The emphasis on insight is discernible in the emphasis in Chan Buddhism on sudden insight (subitism), though in the Chan tradition, this insight is to be followed by gradual cultivation.

Indo-Tibetan tradition

In Tibetan Buddhism, the classical practice of śamatha and vipaśyanā is strongly influenced by the Mahāyāna text called the Bhavanakrama of Indian master Kamalaśīla. Kamalaśīla defines vipaśyanā as "the discernment of reality" (bhūta-pratyavekṣā) and "accurately realizing the true nature of dharmas". According to Thrangu Rinpoche, when shamatha and vipashyana are combined, as in the mainstream Madhyamaka approach of Shantideva and Kamalashila, through samatha disturbing emotions are abandoned, which thus facilitates vipashyana, "clear seeing". Vipashyana is cultivated through reasoning, logic and analysis in conjunction with Shamatha. In contrast, in the siddha tradition of the direct approach of Mahamudra and Dzogchen, vipashyana is ascertained directly through looking into one's own mind. After this initial recognition of vipashyana, the steadiness of shamatha is developed within that recognition. According to Thrangu Rinpoche, it is however also common in the direct approach to first develop enough shamatha to serve as a basis for vipashyana. Dzogchen Ponlop Rinpoche charts the developmental relationship of the practices of śamatha and vipaśyanā:

Samatha
Tibetan writers usually define samatha practice as when one's mind remains fixed on a single object without moving. Dakpo Tashi Namgyal for example, defines samatha as:
by fixing the mind upon any object so as to maintain it without distraction . . . by focusing the mind on an object and maintaining it in that state until finally it is channeled into one stream of attention and evenness.

According to Geshe Lhundup Sopa, samatha is:
just a one-pointedness of mind (cittaikagrata) on a meditative object (alambana). Whatever the object may be . . . if the mind can remain upon its object one-pointedly, spontaneously and without effort (nabhisamskara), and for as long a period of time as the meditator likes, it is approaching the attainment of meditative stabilization (samatha).

Śamatha furthers the right concentration aspect of the noble eightfold path. The successful result of śamatha is also sometimes characterized as meditative absorption (samādhi, ting nge ’dzin) and meditative equipoise (samāhita, mnyam-bzhag), and freedom from the five obstructions (āvaraṇa, sgrib-pa). It may also result in the siddhis of clairvoyance (abhijñā, mgon shes) and magical emanation (nirmāna, sprul pa).

According to Culadasa (2015), "Samatha has five characteristics: effortlessly stable attention (samādhi), powerful mindfulness (sati), joy (pīti), tranquility (passaddhi), and equanimity (upekkhā). The complete state of samatha results from working with stable attention (samādhi) and mindfulness (sati) until joy emerges. Joy then gradually matures into tranquility, and equanimity arises out of that tranquility. A mind in samatha is the ideal instrument for achieving Insight and Awakening"

Vipassana
Indian Mahāyāna Buddhism employed both deductive investigation (applying ideas to experience) and inductive investigation (drawing conclusions from direct experience) in the practice of vipaśyanā. According to Leah Zahler, only the tradition of deductive analysis in vipaśyanā was transmitted to Tibet in the sūtrayāna context. In Tibet direct examination of moment-to-moment experience as a means of generating insight became exclusively associated with vajrayāna.

Mahāmudrā and Dzogchen
Śamatha is approached somewhat differently in the mahāmudrā tradition as practiced in the Kagyu lineage.  As Traleg Kyabgon Rinpoche explains,

For the Kagyupa, in the context of mahāmudrā, śamatha by means of mindfulness of breathing is thought to be the ideal way for the meditator to transition into taking the mind itself as the object of meditation and generating vipaśyanā on that basis.

Quite similar is the approach to śamatha found in dzogchen semde (Sanskrit: mahāsandhi cittavarga). In the semde system, śamatha is the first of the four yogas (Tib. naljor), the others being  vipaśyanā, nonduality (advaya, Tib. nyime,), and spontaneous presence (anābogha or nirābogha, Tib. lhundrub). These parallel the four yogas of mahāmudrā.

Ajahn Amaro, a longtime student in the Thai Forest Theravādin tradition of Ajahn Chah, has also trained in the  dzogchen semde śamatha approach under Tsoknyi Rinpoche. He found similarities in the approaches of the two traditions to śamatha.

Mahāmudrā and Dzogchen use vipaśyanā extensively. This includes some methods of the other traditions, but also their own specific approaches. They place a greater emphasis on meditation on symbolic images. Additionally in the Vajrayāna (tantric) path, the true nature of mind is pointed out by the guru, and this serves as a direct form of insight.

Similar practices in other religions
Meditations from other religious traditions may also be recognized as samatha meditation, that differ in the focus of concentration. In this sense, samatha is not a strictly Buddhist meditation. Samatha in its single-pointed focus and concentration of mind is cognate with the sixth "limb" of aṣṭanga yoga', rāja yoga which is concentration (dhāraṇā).  For further discussion, see the Yoga Sūtras of Patañjali.

See also

Notes

References

Sources
Printed sources

 
 
 
 
 
 

 

 

 

 
 
 
 
 
 

 
 
 
 
 
 
 
 

 
 
 

 
 
 

 
 
 
 

Web-sources

External links

Samatha
 Dharma Fellowship, Deepening Calm-Abiding - The Nine Stages of Abiding
 Skyflower Dharmacenter, Mahamudra Tranquility and Insight
 The Samatha Association
 The Buddho Foundation

Vipassana
History:
 Theravāda Spirituality in the West

Background:
 Insight Meditation Online From Buddhanet.net
 Mahasi Sayadaw, Satipatthana Vipassana: Criticisms and Replies
 Jeffrey S, Brooks, The Fruits (Phala) of the Contemplative Life
 Publications in the Theravāda tradition/ Pariyatti.org

Practice:
  Abhidhamma Vipassana
 Meditation From'' Yellowrobe.com
 Vipassana Meditation as taught by S.N. Goenka and his assistant teachers in the tradition of Sayagyi U Ba Khin at free centers worldwide
 Saddhamma Foundation Information about practicing Vipassana meditation.
 Practical Guidelines for Vipassanâ by Ayya Khema
 Turning to the Source by V.R. Dhiravamsa 
 The Middle Path of Life by V.R. Dhiravamsa 
 Healing through Pure Mindfulness by V.R. Dhiravamsa

Buddhist meditation
Buddhist philosophical concepts
Reality
Spiritual faculties
Mindfulness (Buddhism)
Nondualism